Dennis Lee Milligan (born October 24, 1957) is the current Arkansas State Auditor following the 2022 election. He previously served as Treasurer of Arkansas. For that position he won the Republican Party nomination in the primary election on May 20, 2014, and the general election on November 4, 2014. Milligan took office as treasurer on January 13, 2015. 

Milligan was born in Conway in Faulkner County, Arkansas. Prior to his election as state treasurer, he was the circuit clerk of Saline County, based in Benton, for two terms from 2011, and an Arkansas businessman for thirty years. Milligan is a former chairman of the Arkansas Republican Party from 2007 to 2008 and has served as its treasurer.

Milligan ran against Duncan Baird in the 2014 primary, and his opponents in the general election that year included Democrat Karen Garcia and Libertarian Chris Hayes. Libertarian Ashley Ewald ran against Milligan in the 2018 general election, in which he was re-elected with 71 percent of the vote.

Electoral history

References

External links
 Official Arkansas State Treasurer web site

|-

|-

|-

|-

 

1957 births
21st-century American politicians
Arkansas Republican state chairmen
Arkansas Republicans
County clerks in Arkansas
Living people
People from Benton, Arkansas
People from Bryant, Arkansas
People from Conway, Arkansas
State Auditors of Arkansas
State treasurers of Arkansas